Clubland's Greatest Hits is the first compilation album released by American singer Joi Cardwell through K-Tel and Cold Front Records on November 10, 1998. It marked her first album release, following her defunct from Eightball Records, as well her first and last album for K-Tel and Cold Front Records. The greatest hits album features the highest-charting singles from Cardwell's two studio albums released between 1995 and 1997 as well as a few remixes of her past singles.

Background
In 1998, Cardwell departed from Eightball Records. The two-disc collection comprising eight songs and a variety of remixes was later released by K-Tel in collaboration with Cold Front Records. In an interview with Billboard, Cardwell stated, "Oh, that compilation was such a fiasco." when talking about her then-new greatest hits album More (1992-2003).

Clubland's Greatest Hits received a mixed review from The Boston Phoenix's Michael Freedberg, who criticized the album's content by saying, "These 14 tracks aren't clubland's greatest hits but Cardwell has long been one of the first-called house-music divas, and these songs tell why."

Track listing

Personnel
Credits adapted from the liner notes of Clubland's Greatest Hits.

 Joi Cardwell – lead vocals (All tracks), backing vocals, producer, executive producer, songwriting
 Hani Al-Bader – producer
 Eddie Baez – producer
 Marcia Button – graphic artist
 Konrad Carelli – additional recording engineer
 Carlton Carter – drums, programming, producer
 Fred Cash – bass guitar
 Phillip Damien – producer
Deep Dish – producer
 Michael T. Diamond – producer
 Kazuhiko Gomi – programming, producer
 Hex Hector – producer

 Jon Kevin Jones – guitar
 Fred Jorio – programming
 Frankie Knuckles – producer
 Shedrick Mitchell – organ
 George Morel – drums, programming, producer
 James 'Sleepy Keys' Preston – piano, songwriting
 Warren Riker – mixing
 Anthony Saunders – engineer
 Peter "Ski" Schwartz – producer
 Duncan Stanbury – mastering
 Junior Vasquez – producer
 Willy Washington – songwriting

References

1998 greatest hits albums
House music compilation albums
Joi Cardwell albums